Stebbings is a surname. Notable people with the surname include:

Benjamin Stebbings (born 1989), British cricketer
Paul Stebbings, British actor and theatre director
Peter Stebbings (born 1971), Canadian actor, director, producer, and screenwriter

See also
Stebbing (disambiguation)